HMAS River Snake was a Snake-class junk built for the Royal Australian Navy during the Second World War. She was launched in 1945 and commissioned into the Royal Australian Navy on 19 February 1945. She was used by the Services Reconnaissance Department (SRD) and was paid off on 2 November 1945, before being handed over to the British Civil Administration in Borneo.

Operation Suncharlie
During Operation Suncharlie SRD operatives were deployed from HMAS River Snake, an Australian built Country Craft, in Portuguese Timor on 23 April 1945. This operation, partly using folboats (collapsible kayaks), was to be for long term intelligence work, but after a short reconnaissance they returned to River Snake on 26 April 1945.

Commander John Gowing.

Notes

References

Further reading

Snake-class junks
1945 ships
Ships built in Western Australia